The margined sculpin (Cottus marginatus) is a species of freshwater ray-finned fish belonging to the family Cottidae, the typical sculpins. It is found in the United States, inhabiting the Columbia River drainage from the Walla Walla River system, Washington, to the Umatilla River system in Oregon. It reaches a maximum length of 13.0 cm. It prefers rubble and gravel riffles.

References

Cottus (fish)
Fish described in 1881
Taxa named by Tarleton Hoffman Bean